Echeveria colorata, is a species of flowering plant in the family Crassulaceae, endemic to Mexico.

Description

Taxonomy
Synonym: 
Echeveria lindsayana Walther 1972

Forms:
Echeveria colorata f. brandtii

Cultivars:
Echeveria colorata 'Haage'
Echeveria colorata 'Mexican Giant'

Hybrids:
Echeveria 'Beatrice'
Echeveria 'Frank Reinelt'
Echeveria 'Laulindsa'
Echeveria 'Margaret Martin'
× Graptoveria 'Opalina'

Cultivation
Echeveria colorata is cultivated as an ornamental plant for rock gardens and as a potted plant. 

Optimum growing temperature 23°C to 25°C.
In Australia the summer temperatures can reach above 40°C so protection will be required. Either move into a more shaded position or shade cloth covering of 70%.

Etymology
Echeveria is named for Atanasio Echeverría y Godoy, a botanical illustrator who contributed to Flora Mexicana.

Colorata means 'colored'.

References

External links  

colorata
Endemic flora of Mexico
Garden plants of North America
Drought-tolerant plants